The Constitution of 1962 was the fundamental law of Islamic Republic of Pakistan from 8 June 1962 until martial law was declared in 25 March 1969. It was abrogated on 25 March 1969 by President Yahya Khan.

Origins

Pakistan became an independent state in 1947. The first document that served as a constitution for Pakistan was the Government of India Act, 1935. The first Pakistani Constituent Assembly was elected in 1947 and after nine years adopted the first indigenous constitution, the short-lived Constitution of 1956. In October 1958, President Iskander Mirza abrogated the constitution. Shortly afterwards General Ayub Khan deposed Iskandar and declared himself president.

On 17 February 1960 Ayub Khan appointed a commission to report on the future constitutional framework for the country. The commission was headed by the former Chief Justice of Pakistan, Muhammad Shahabuddin, and had ten other members, five each from East Pakistan and West Pakistan, composed of retired judges, lawyers, industrialists and landlords. The report of the Constitution Commission was presented to President Ayub on 6 May 1961 (according to some writers report was presented on 29 April 1961) and thoroughly examined by the president and his Cabinet. In January 1962, the Cabinet finally approved the text of the new constitution. It was promulgated by President Ayub on 1 March 1962 and finally came into effect on 8 June 1962. The Constitution contained 250 articles divided into twelve parts and three schedules. With the enforcement of this Constitution after 44 months, martial law came to end.

Provisions

Pakistan was named the Republic of Pakistan. The constitution provided for a federal system with the principle of parity between East Pakistan and West Pakistan. Both the provinces would run their separate provincial governments. The responsibilities and authority of the centre and the provinces were clearly listed in the constitution. The central legislature had one house known as the National Assembly. There were 157 members of the National Assembly. The equality between the two wings were maintained in it.

The constitution provided for a presidential form of government, as opposed to the parliamentary form of government under the 1956 Constitution. The president, who had to be a Muslim not less than 35 years of age and qualified for election as a member of the National Assembly, was to be elected indirectly by an electoral college in accordance with the provisions outlined in the Constitution. The Electoral College formed by not less than 80,000 Basic Democrats, equally distributed between the two provinces. Under the Constitution of 1962, if the number of candidates for election to the office of President exceeded three, the Speaker of the National Assembly was to convene a joint session of the members of the National and Provincial Assemblies to select only three candidates for election, the remaining candidates then would not be eligible. This screening was not applicable to a person who was holding the office of the president, so if the sitting president was also a candidate the number of candidates would be four.

The term of the president was five years to act as head of state as well as chief executive, solely responsible for country's administration. Governors and ministers were appointed and removed by him. He was eligible to promulgate ordinances and veto against legislated laws only overrideable by two-thirds of the National Assembly. However, the president was not empowered to dissolve the Assembly except at the cost of his office also. On a charge of violating the Constitution or gross misconduct, the president might be impeached by the National Assembly for which one-third of the total members of the National Assembly must give written notice to the speaker for the removal of the president. The president was to be removed from office if the resolution for impeachment was passed by votes of not less than three-fourths of the total members of the Assembly. A significant feature of the impeachment procedure was that if the resolution for removal of the president failed to obtain one-half of the total number of members of the National Assembly, the movers of the resolution would cease to be members of the Assembly.

There was no restriction of religion for a person holding the office of the speaker of the National Assembly. Also, if the president resigned from his office or vote of no-confidence passes against him, according to the Constitution, the speaker would act as the president of the state till the election of new president. Under these special circumstances, a non-Muslim might get the chance to be an acting president of Pakistan.

The Constitution of 1962 provided for elections of the central and provincial legislatures for a term of five years. The members of the assemblies were elected by the Basic Democrats. The National Assembly was exclusively empowered to legislate for the central subjects. However, it could legislate on matters falling under provincial jurisdiction. The power to impose taxes was laid with the central legislature. The Assembly had to serve as a court in the cases of impeachment or conviction or to declare the president as incapacitated. It could amend the Constitution with a two-thirds majority. However, if the president's veto was overridden, he had the right to ask for the assent of the Electoral College. The procedure of the provincial assemblies was identical with that of the National Assembly.

Urdu and Bengali were recognised as national languages.

Salient features of 1962 Constitution 

1. Federal System:
Under the constitution of 1962 federal system was adopted. The powers of the central government were enumerated in the Federal List while all the residuary powers were given to the provinces so as to meet the demand of provincial autonomy. However, with in this federal structure, the central government was made domineering even at the cost of provincial autonomy. Besides in the administrative matters, centralism was clearly reflected. The provincial governors were the appointees of President and accountable to him: Hence the provincial executive was under the control of the center. This centralism bore more disastrous results in respect of provincial autonomy. Consequently, the federal structure practically seemed unitary due to which the demand of provincial autonomy became more popular and widespread which threatened our solidarity in the later stage.

2. A Written and Detailed Document:
The 1962 constitution was written in nature and character. It consisted of 250 Articles and 3 Schedules. Thus it was comparatively detailed document. Keeping in view the lack of democratic values and established norms it was thought expedient to give a detailed code of constitutional law as could regulate the conduct of different political institutions.

3. Islamic Provisions:
Like previous constitution of 1956 the Objective Resolution was included in the Preamble of the constitution. The teachings of Quran and Islamiyat were to be made compulsory. The President was to be Muslim. Pakistan was declared an Islamic republic through first amendment. No un-Islamic law would be enacted and all the existing laws would be Islamized etc.

4. Position of the President:
Under the Constitution of 1962 US-type presidential system was enforced to overcome political instability and establish a firm socio-economic and political order. All the executive authority was vested in the President who was unanimously responsible for the business of the central government. All the ministers were appointed by him and they were accountable to him alone. They could participate in the deliberations of the legislature but they were not responsible to it. Along with the provincial governors all the top ranking officials were appointed by him. The president also enjoyed certain legislative, military and judicial powers. The provincial set up also followed the central structure. In short, it was the President who was all in all.

5. Unicameral Legislature:
The 1962 Constitution like the previous constitution provided for unicameral legislature called National Assembly. Its total strength was 156 (later 218 and then 313, who were elected by the electoral college of Basic Democrats. Besides, certain seats were also reserved for women. Its term was 5 years, which was fixed. The members were elected on the basis of parity of representation between East and West wing. The proceedings of the Assembly might not be challenged in any court of law. Unlike the previous practices the members of the cabinet were not the members of the legislature. The ministers could attend its meetings but like US system neither the president nor his cabinet colleagues were responsible to it.

6. Indirect Election:
It was a new innovation in the 1962 Constitution. It was a general impression that one of the causes of the failure of the constitutional machinery was the direct and adult suffrage and without proper and necessary political education and training. Hence this constitution provided indirect method of election for President and for the legislative assemblies was envisaged. Accordingly, the primary voters would elect the Basic Democrats who had then to elect the representatives to higher positions.

7. Independence of Judiciary:
Proper safeguards were introduced in the 1962 Constitution to ensure the independence of judiciary. Judges of the superior courts were appointed by the President and were ensured security of service. They could be removed on the inquiry report submitted by the Supreme Judicial Council on the ground of misbehavior or physical or mental inability to perform their duties. By induction of first amendment the judiciary had full, power to pass judgment over the views of the legislature. Moreover, the court also enjoyed the power of judicial review of executive actions.

8. Fundamental Rights add Principles of Policy:
In the original constitution there was no list of fundamental rights. It was due to the first amendment in the constitution in 1963 that these were included and made its part, prior to that these were laid down in the directive principles of policy. The list of fundamental rights contained almost all the rights secured to its citizens by a modern state. The Principles of Policy were also incorporated in the constitution. Most of the Islamic provisions were made the part thereof. These principles of policy dealt with such matters as Islamic way of life, national integration and solidarity, social welfare, protection of the rights of minorities, development of backward areas etc.

9. Provincial Governments:
Each province had a provincial assembly, which was organized on the lines of National Assembly. The relationship of the provincial governors with their assemblies was the same like that of President with National Assembly. The assemblies of the East and West Pakistan used to meet at Dacca and Lahore respectively. Each had 155 members, at least of who were women. The governors appointed by the President, had a Council of Ministers in the same manner, as the President, who belonged to their respective province.

Although the 1962 constitution of Pakistan had transferred several responsibilities to the provincial governments but in actual practice the central government or its representatives used to exercise these powers.

Islamic provisions
 The preamble of the Constitution of 1962 was based on the Objectives Resolution.
 The Constitution laid down simply that the state of Pakistan shall be an Islamic republic under the name of Islamic Republic of Pakistan.
 According to the principles of policy, steps were to be taken to enable the Muslims of Pakistan individually and collectively, to order their lives in accordance with the fundamental principles and basic concepts of Islam, and should be provided with facilities whereby they may be enabled to understand the meaning of life according to those principles and concepts.
 No law shall be enacted which is repugnant to the teachings and requirements of Islam as set out in the Qur'an and Sunnah and all existing laws shall be brought in conformity with the Qur'an and Sunnah.
 Only a Muslim could be qualified for the election as president.
 Teaching of the Quran and Islamiyah to the Muslims of Pakistan was made compulsory.
 Proper organization of Zakat, waqf, and mosques was ensured.
 Practical steps were to be taken to eradicate what were seen as social evils by Islam, such as the use of alcohol, gambling, etc.
 A novel Islamic provision in the 1962 Constitution had introduced an Advisory Council of Islamic Ideology to be appointed by the president. The functions of the council was to make recommendations to the government as to means which would enable and encourage the Muslims of Pakistan to order their lives in accordance with the principles and concepts of Islam and to examine all laws in force with a view to bring them into conformity with the teachings and requirements of Islam as set out in the Qur'an and Sunnah.
 There shall be an organization to be known as Islamic Research Institute, which shall be established by the president. The function of the institute was to undertake Islamic research and Instruction in Islam for the purpose of assisting in the reconstruction of Muslim society on a truly Islamic basis.
 The state should endeavor to strengthen the bonds of unity among Muslim countries.

Demise
The second martial law was imposed on 25 March 1969 by  General Agha Mohammad Yahya Khan, after General Ayub Khan handed over power to the army commander-in-chief, and not the speaker of National Assembly as laid down by the constitution. On assuming the presidency, General Yahya Khan acceded to popular demands by abolishing the one-unit system in West Pakistan on 1 July 1970 and ordered general elections on the principle of one man one vote. The first ever general elections were held in December 1970, however, the government was not transferred to the Awami League Elections. This resulted in destruction of national unity (chiefly by military rulers) and eventual the separation of East Pakistan was fought.

Chronology of the Constitution
1959 The Basic Democracy (BD) was introduced through the Basic Democracy Order

1960 February 17 General Ayub Khan appointed a Constitution of the commission under the supervision of Shahab u Din

1961 May 6 ( some claim April 29) Constitutional Commission submitted its report to the President

1962 June 8 Ayub Khan enforced the constitution.

1969 March 25 constitution of 1962 was abrogated by General Yahya Khan.

See also
History of Pakistan
Politics of Pakistan
Constitution of Pakistan of 1956
Constitution of Pakistan

References

1962 in law
 
Pakistani philosophical literature
1962 documents